Marie Pape-Carpantier (1815–1878) was a French educator born on 11 September 1815 in Sarthe, France and died in Villiers-le-Bel (Val-d'Oise) on 31 July 1878. She grew to play a major part in revolutionizing education in French schools. She was a feminist who worked to fix poverty, social injustice, and to further the education of girls. She also wrote articles for the weekly French newspaper "The French Economist".

References

1815 births
1878 deaths
French educators
People from La Flèche